Máire Bhuí Ní Laoghaire (1774–c.1848) was an Irish poet.

Ní Laoghaire was born in Túirín na nÉan in Uibh Laoghaire (Iveleary), near Ballingeary, County Cork. She was from a family of five sons and three daughters who lived on her father's fifty acre farm. In 1792, she married Séamus de Búrca, a Skibbereen horsetrader and the couple settled on a holding they purchased near Céim an Fhia/Keimaneigh. While they were known for their generosity, their fortunes had declined by 1847 and they were unable to pay their rent. Mounting debts and their arrest for membership of a secret agrarian organisation led to their eviction. Ní Laoghaire died soon after and was buried in Inchigeelagh.

Career
She was illiterate in both English and Irish, and learned through the oral tradition in the ceilidh houses. Her poems sometimes allude to classical mythology, as is often seen in the Munster Irish oral poetry of the era. Her songs and poems survived via the oral tradition of the area, as did compositions by her contemporaries such as Antoine Ó Raifteiri.

Her best-known composition is Cath Chéim an Fhia (The Battle of Keimaneigh), which provides an account of a fight between the local yeoman militia and the Whiteboys in 1822.

Further reading

References

1774 births
1848 deaths
18th-century Irish-language poets
19th-century Irish-language poets
People from County Cork
Irish women poets
Irish poets